Daybreak may refer to:
 Dawn, the beginning of the twilight before sunrise
 Sunrise, when the upper edge of the Sun appears over the horizon

Books
 Al-Falaq (Dawn, Daybreak), the 113th Sura of the Qur'an
 Daybreak, comic book by Brian Ralph 
 Daybreak, adventure book by Ally Kennen
 Daybreak (Nietzsche book), an 1881 book of aphorisms by Friedrich Nietzsche
 Daybreak, a 1968 autobiographical memoir by folk singer Joan Baez

Films
 Daybreak (1918 film), a silent film
 Daybreak (1931 film), an MGM film with Ramon Novarro
 Daybreak (1933 film), a Chinese film directed by Sun Yu
 Daybreak, a 1939 French film by Marcel Carnè also known as Le Jour Se Lève
 Daybreak (1948 film), a British film starring Ann Todd
 Daybreak (1954 film), a West German film directed by Viktor Tourjansky 
 Daybreak (1993 film), an HBO film starring Cuba Gooding, Jr., Moira Kelly, Martha Plimpton, and Omar Epps
 Day Break (2005 film), an Iranian film directed by Hamid Rahmanian
 Daybreak (2008 film), a Filipino film
 Daybreak, a 2009 Colombian-Australian film also known as Amanecer
 Daybreak (2017 film), an Albanian film

Music
 Daybreak (band), a South Korean band

Albums
 Daybreak (Chet Baker album)
 Daybreak (Dave Burrell album)
 Daybreak (Paul Field album)
 Daybreak (Béla Fleck album)
 Daybreak, an album by Paul Hardcastle
 Daybreak, an album by Mezzoforte
 Daybreak (Saves the Day album)
 Daybreak, an album by Leanne & Naara

Songs
 "Daybreak", a song by Harry Nilsson from the 1974 film Son of Dracula
 "Daybreak", a song by the Stone Roses from the album Second Coming
 "Daybreak" (Ayumi Hamasaki song)
 "Daybreak" (Barry Manilow song)
 "Daybreak", a 1925 song by Harold Adamson in the orchestral suite Mississippi Suite, also recorded by Frank Sinatra
 "Daybreak", a song by Janet Jackson from the album 20 Y.O.
 "Daybreak", a song by Linda Perhacs from the album The Soul of All Natural Things
 "Daybreak", a song by Michael Haggins, used in several episodes of Community
 "Daybreak", a song by Minhyun and JR of NUEST
 "Daybreak", a song by Overwerk from the album After hours
 "Daybreak (GoPro HERO3 Edit)" an edit of the original song "Daybreak"
 "Daybreak", a song by Anomalie from the album Métropole

Radio
 Daybreak, the local morning program of CBC Radio One station CBME-FM
 Daybreak USA, an American syndicated talk radio show

Television
 Day Break, a 2006 ABC television series
 CNN Daybreak, a former CNN early day show
 Daybreak (1983 TV series), a defunct British morning television programme that ran from 1983 to 1984
 Daybreak (2010 TV programme), the British morning television programme on ITV from September 2010
 Daybreak (1993 film), a TV movie produced in 1993, starring Cuba Gooding, Jr. and Moira Kelly
 "Daybreak" (Battlestar Galactica), the final two-part episode of the re-imagined Battlestar Galactica television series
 Daybreak, a local morning news show on KATV in Little Rock, Arkansas
 Daybreak (Philippine TV program), a Philippine English-language morning hard-news newscast of 9TV
 Daybreak Scotland, a former regional news broadcaster for the two ITV regions in northern and central Scotland (2007–2010)
 Daybreak (2019 TV series), a Netflix television series

Other
 Daybreak (board game), upcoming board game about climate change
 Daybreak (painting), 1922 painting by Maxfield Parrish
 Daybreak Game Company, video game developer and publisher (formerly Sony Online Entertainment)
 Daybreak (community), a planned development in South Jordan, Utah, US

See also
 Daybreaker (disambiguation)